Tribeni may refer to:

 Tribeni, Hooghly, town in Bansberia municipality, Hooghly district, West Bengal, India
 Tribeni, Parbat, former village development committee in Parbat District, Nepal
 Tribeni, Udayapur, former village development committee in Udayapur District in the Sagarmatha Zone of south-eastern Nepal

People with the given name
 Tribeni Sahai Misra, former judge in India

Also matching with
Aathrai Tribeni Rural Municipality, a rural municipality in Nepal
Binayi Tribeni Rural Municipality, a rural municipality in Nepal

See also
 Tribenisusta
 Triveni (disambiguation)